Helophilus are a diverse genus of moderate to large hoverflies, that appear somewhat bee-like. Larvae filter-feed in organic rich water. All Helophilus adults have a distinctive lengthwise striped thorax and a transverse striped abdomen.

Species

Subgenus: Helophilus
H. affinis Wahlberg, 1844
H. bilinearis Williston, 1887
H. borealis Staeger, 1845
H. bottnicus Wahlberg, 1844
H. celeber Osten Sacken, 1882
H. consimilis Malm, 1863
H. continuus Loew, 1854
H. contractus (Claussen & Pedersen, 1980)
H. distinctus Williston, 1887
H. fasciatus Walker, 1849
H. frutetorum (Fabricius, 1775)
H. groenlandicus (Fabricius, 1780)
H. hybridus Loew, 1846
H. insignis Violovitsh, 1979
H. intentus Curran and Fluke, 1922
H. interpunctus (Harris, 1776)
H. kurentzovi (Violovitsh, 1960)
H. lapponicus Wahlberg, 1844
H. latifrons Loew, 1863
H. lineatus (Fabricius, 1787)
H. lunulatus Meigen, 1822
H. neoaffinis Fluke, 1949
H. obscurus Loew, 1863
H. oxycanus (Walker, 1852)
H. parallelus (Harris, 1776)
H. pendulus (Linnaeus, 1758)
H. perfidiosus (Hunter, 1897)
H. pilosus Hunter, 1897
H. relictus (Curran & Fluke, 1926)
H. sapporensis Matsumura, 1911
H. sibiricus Smirnov, 1923
H. stipatus Walker, 1849
H. transfugus (Linnaeus, 1758)
H. trivittatus (Fabricius, 1805)
H. turanicus Smirnov, 1923
H. versicolor (Fabricius, 1794)
H. virgatus Coquillett, 1898

Subgenus: Pilinasica
H. antipodus Schiner, 1868
H. campbelli (Miller, 1921)
H. campbellicus Hutton, 1902
H. cargilli Miller, 1911
H. chathamensis Hutton, 1901
H. cingulatus Fabricius, 1775
H. hectori Miller, 1924
H. hochstetteri Nowicki, 1875
H. ineptus Walker, 1849
H. montanus (Miller, 1921)
H. seelandicus Gmelin, 1790
H. taruensis Miller, 1924

References

Hoverfly genera
Taxa named by Johann Wilhelm Meigen
Eristalinae
Taxa described in 1822